The Christ Episcopal Church, at junction of 10th Ave. and Linden St. in Sidney, Nebraska, is a historic Shingle Style church that was built during 1886–87. It was listed on the National Register of Historic Places (NRHP) in 1994;  the listing included the church as a contributing building and a 1950 rectory as a non-contributing building.

It is significant as "one of a few remaining physical representations in the state that is closely
associated with the government's attempt to integrate Native Americans into the army and consequentially
adopt Euro-American social mores. The church was used by, among others, Company I, Twenty-First Infantry
which was composed of Native Americans and commanded by a white officer."  Company I was posted at Fort Sidney during 1892 to 1894, the period of significance designated for the church in the NRHP listing.

References

External links

Churches on the National Register of Historic Places in Nebraska
Shingle Style architecture in Nebraska
Buildings and structures in Cheyenne County, Nebraska
Episcopal church buildings in Nebraska
National Register of Historic Places in Cheyenne County, Nebraska